The 1957–58 Yugoslav First League season was the 12th season of the First Federal League, the top level association football league of SFR Yugoslavia, since its establishment in 1946. Fourteen teams contested the competition, with Dinamo Zagreb winning their third title and qualifying for the 1958–59 European Cup.

At the end of season four teams were relegated instead of the usual two because the Football Association of Yugoslavia decided to reduce the league to 12 teams for the following season.

Teams
At the end of the previous season FK Sarajevo and Lokomotiva were relegated from top level. They were replaced by Željezničar and RNK Split.

League table

Results

Winning squad
Champions:
Dinamo Zagreb (coach: Gustav Lechner)

players (league matches/league goals): 
Ivica Banožić 18 (0)
Aleksandar Benko 12 (8)
Tomislav Crnković 25 (0)
Vladimir Čonč 20 (4)
Emil Ferković 5 (0)
Franjo Gašpert 22 (7)
Drago Hmelina 8 (1)
Ivan Horvat 26 (0)
Bernard Hugl 3 (0)
Gordan Irović 24 (0)
Dražan Jerković 22 (17)
Marijan Kolonić 1 (0)
Mladen Koščak 22 (0)
Luka Lipošinović 20 (8)
Željko Matuš 20 (3)
Zdravko Prelčec 4 (1)
Branko Režek 24 (2)
Ivan Šantek 8 (0)

Top scorers

See also
1957–58 Yugoslav Second League
1957–58 Yugoslav Cup

References

External links
Yugoslavia Domestic Football Full Tables

Yugoslav First League seasons
Yugo
1

hr:Prvenstvo Jugoslavije u nogometu 1957./58.